Zeem, or Chaari, is an endangered Chadic dialect cluster of Nigeria, whose speakers are shifting to Hausa. Dyarim is closely related.

The Zeem language is spoken in Toro LGA, Bauchi State. The Tulai and Danshe dialects are no longer spoken. It is also called Chaari, Dokshi, Dyarum, Kaiwari, Kaiyorawa, Lukshi, and Lushi.

Dyarim had been influenced by Beromic languages during a time when Beromic was more widespread.

Varieties
Zeem-Caari-Danshe-Dyarim cluster varieties listed by Blench (2019):

Zeem (extinct)
Tule (extinct)
Danshe
Chaari
Dyarim
Dokshi (Lukshi, Lushi)
Jimi

Blench reports in 2019 that only 3 very elderly speakers of the Dokshi (or Lukshi) language remain in the village of Lukshi, Bauchi State.

Notes

Chadic languages